Tritetrabdella is a genus of terrestrial hemataphagous leeches in the family Haemadipsidae. Unlike other haemadipsid leeches, Tritetrabdella species have four annuli on their mid-body segments. They have three jaws, with a total 45  teeth, and lack salivary papillae. Tritrabdella feeds primarily on amphibians and probably on small mammals as well, but to a lesser extent.  Bornean species may be endangered due to amphibian population decline, disturbance and fragmentation of habitat, and climate fluctuations.

Species 
Five species are recognized:

References 

Leeches
Indomalayan realm fauna
Invertebrates of Southeast Asia